Robert Bruce Litterman (born 1951) is chairman of the Risk Committee and a founding partner of Kepos Capital in New York. Prior to Kepos Capital, Litterman spent 23 years at Goldman Sachs, where he was head of the Quantitative Resources Group in Goldman Sachs Asset Management for 11 years, starting in 1998. Prior to that position, Litterman headed the firm-wide risk department from 1994 to 1998, and prior to that he was the co-head of the model development group in the research department of Goldman Sachs' Fixed Income Division. Litterman received a Ph.D. in economics from the University of Minnesota in 1980.

Black-Litterman model 

At Goldman Sachs Litterman developed the Black–Litterman model together with Fischer Black in 1990.

The model solves a seemingly simple yet perplexing problem: it is difficult to consistently estimate expected returns from various assets. The Black–Litterman model solves this problem by making expected returns an output, rather than an input, in the model. The model combines information from market equilibrium with views about returns of assets or combinations of assets, in order to generate the expected returns.

The Black–Litterman model has become one of the standard models widely used by investors around the world to optimize portfolios. Litterman is the author of Modern Investment Management: An Equilibrium Approach, together with Goldman Sachs Asset Management's Quantitative Resources Group.

Climate policy work 

Shortly after retiring from Goldman Sachs in 2009, Litterman moved, together with several other former Goldman partners such as Mark Tercek and Larry Linden, into the climate and environmental policy world. (Tercek is now the present and CEO of The Nature Conservancy. Linden is the founder of the Linden Trust for the Environment, donating to several climate and environmental causes.)

Litterman serves as director of the Woodwell Climate Research Center, World Wildlife Fund, Resources for the Future and Climate Central. He also serves on the economic advisory council of the Environmental Defense Fund, and he serves on the boards of the Julie Wrigley Global Institute of Sustainability at Arizona State University, the Woods Institute for the Environment at Stanford University, the Heller Hurwicz Economics Institute at the University of Minnesota, the Commonfund, and the Climate Leadership Council, founded by Ted Halstead.

Litterman is a staunch advocate for a carbon tax. He created the EZ Climate carbon pricing model, joint with Columbia University's Kent Daniel and Gernot Wagner. He leads the Climate-Related Market Risk Subcommittee of the Commodity Futures Trading Commission (CFTC).

References 

1951 births
Living people
21st-century American economists
Goldman Sachs people
University of Minnesota College of Liberal Arts alumni
Stanford University alumni
Date of birth missing (living people)